Scott Jenkins is an American politician and businessman from Utah. A Republican, he is a member of the Utah State Senate, representing the state's 20th senate district covering parts of Weber and Davis counties. He is retiring from his position as Senator and will not be running for reelection in 2016. Jenkins has an associate degree from Weber State University.

Personal life and education
Jenkins has lived in Utah all his life. He was raised about 100 feet from where he lives now. Jenkins went to Weber High School and earned his A.S. from Weber State College. He is married to his wife, Rebecca, and they have  five children: Jennifer, Erick, Jolene, Irene, and Austin.

Background

 Did Judiciary, Law Enforcement, and Criminal Justice Confirmation Committee as chair of the Plain City Planning Commission
 Plain City Council
 Plain City Mayor
 Weber Area Council of Governments
 Bona Vista Water District (Chair and Board of Directors)
 Weber County Boundary Commission (Chair)

Political career
was elected to be a Senator in 2000. He served as the Majority Leader from 2009 to 2012. Before his time in the Senate, Jenkins was Mayor of Plain City, Utah, and a Member of the Plain City Council, Utah, 1979–1987.

Jenkins has been a member of the following committees:
 Business, Economic Development, and Labor Appropriations Subcommittee
 Infrastructure and General Government Appropriations Subcommittee
 Senate Natural Resources, Agriculture, and Environment Committee (Chair)
 Senate Revenue and Taxation Committee
 Senate Judicial Confirmation Committee (Chair)
 Senate Natural Resources, Agriculture, and Environment Confirmation Committee
 State Water Development Commission

In 2016, Jenkins served on the following committees:
 Executive Offices and Criminal Justice Appropriations Subcommittee
 Natural Resources, Agriculture, and Environmental Quality Appropriations Subcommittee
 Senate Natural Resources, Agriculture, and Environment Committee (Chair)

Election results
Jenkins last ran for office in 2012, he ran unopposed.

Legislation

2016 sponsored legislation 

Senator Jenkins was also the floor sponsor for the following bills:
 H.B. 20 Lead Acid Battery Disposal Sunset Reauthorization
 H.B. 69 Qualified Political Party Amendments
 H.B. 138 Consumer Electronic Device Recycling Report Amendments
 H.B. 191 Interlock Restricted Driver Amendments
 H.B. 250 Air Quality Amendments
 H.B. 269 Recycling of Copper Wire
 H.B. 429 Specie Legal Tender Amendments
 HCR 11 Concurrent Resolution Encouraging the Repayment of Funds Used to Keep National Parks, Monuments, and Recreation Areas Open

Political positions

Other
In February 2012, Jenkins made headlines in Utah for voting to deny tax breaks for military veterans, arguing the military already enjoys too many perks.

References

1950 births
Living people
Republican Party Utah state senators
Weber State University alumni
Politicians from Ogden, Utah
Businesspeople from Ogden, Utah
21st-century American politicians
People from Plain City, Utah